Anzor Adamovich Boltukayev (born 5 April 1986 in Chechnya) is a Russian freestyle wrestler of Chechen descent. He competes in the 96 kg division and won the bronze medal in the same division at the 2013 World Wrestling Championships defeated Aleksey Krupnyakov of Kyrgyzstan.

At the "Ivan Yarygin 2016" he beat the current World Champion Kyle Snyder and Olympic gold medalist Jake Varner of USA.

In the 2016 European Wrestling Championships he won the gold medal against Ivan Yankouski of Belarus.

He competed at Olympics 2016 in the freestyle 97 kg event and was eliminated by Valerii Andriitsev of Ukraine in the 1/8 final.

Boltukayev failed a drugs test at the 2017 European Wrestling Championships testing positive for higenamine. His subsequent result was disqualified and his silver medal was revoked, he was also banned for two years from 13 September 2018.

References

External links
 

Russian male sport wrestlers
Chechen martial artists
Russian people of Chechen descent
World Wrestling Championships medalists
Wrestlers at the 2016 Summer Olympics
1986 births
Living people
European Wrestling Championships medalists
Sportspeople from Grozny